TLR4-IN-C34 (or C34) is a drug which acts as a potent and selective antagonist of Toll-like receptor 4 (TLR4). In animal studies it blocks TLR4-mediated cytokine release and has antiinflammatory effects.

See also 
 M62812
 Resatorvid

References 

Receptor antagonists
Acetamides
Oxygen heterocycles